Suure-Jaani Parish was a rural municipality of Estonia, in Viljandi County. It had a population of 6,178 (as of 1 January 2009) and an area of 742.83 km2.

Settlements
Town
Suure-Jaani
Small borough
Olustvere
Villages
Aimla - Ängi - Arjadi - Epra - Ilbaku - Ivaski - Jälevere - Jaska - Kabila - Kärevere - Karjasoo - Kerita - Kibaru - Kildu - Kobruvere - Kõidama - Kootsi - Kuhjavere - Kuiavere - Kurnuvere - Lahmuse - Lemmakõnnu - Lõhavere - Mäeküla - Metsküla - Mudiste - Munsi - Navesti - Nuutre - Paelama - Päraküla - Põhjaka - Rääka - Reegoldi - Riiassaare - Sandra - Sürgavere - Tääksi - Taevere - Tällevere - Ülde - Vastemõisa - Vihi - Võhmassaare - Võivaku - Võlli

People
Actress Raine Loo (1945–2020), was born in Taevere Parish, which is now part of Suure-Jaani Parish.

Gallery

See also
Suure-Jaani United

References

External links